Old Prussia may refer to different entities, which were also territorially defined.

In political and territorial respect it refers to: 
 Old Prussia
 The Provinces of Prussia officially formed in 1815 or partially later, whose territories belonged to the Kingdom of Prussia before 1815 or before 1866, especially: 
 in a narrow sense the expression means the entirety of the:
 Province of Brandenburg
 Province of East Prussia
 Province of Pomerania
 Province of Prussia, combining East and West Prussia between 1829 and 1878
 Province of Silesia
 Province of West Prussia
 in the broad sense of the expression the following provinces are also included:
 Province of Hohenzollern
 Rhine Province
 Province of Westphalia

In religious and territorial respect it refers to: 
 Evangelical State Church of Prussia's older Provinces, renamed into Evangelical Church of the old-Prussian Union (1922–1953).

Source: Der Große Brockhaus: Handbuch des Wissens in zwanzig Bänden: 21 vols., 15th totally revised ed., Leipzig: F. A. Brockhaus, 1928–1935, vol. 1: A–Ast, article: 'Altpreußen', p. 356. No ISBN.